The Don Flows Home to the Sea is the title of the English translation for the second part of Mikhail Sholokhov's epic novel And Quiet Flows the Don.

The Don Flows Home to the Sea is Stephen Garry's translation of Volumes 3 and 4 of the novel; Volumes 1 and 2 were published under the title And Quiet Flows the Don in 1930s. In 1943, Garry's translation in these two books was reissued as The Silent Don. It was later noted that the translation lacks about 25 percent of the novel text, and it was revised and completed by Robert Daglish. As it should, the novel was published in four volumes, by Foreign Languages Publishing House in 1950. In 1984, Daglish published his own translation under the title Quiet Flows the Don, again, in four volumes.

The book follows the fortunes of the Don Cossacks in peace and war, revolution and civil war. The novel depicts the destruction of Cossack society during the Civil War. Grigory Melekhov is the protagonist. The book tells of his tragic affair with Aksinia, the wife of a neighbour, and how he fights for the Reds, the Whites, and the Partisans.

Much of the novel used an earlier, unpublished story Sholokhov wrote in 1925 about the Kornilov affair.

Plot
The 1940s English edition subdivides the book into seven major sections.

1. Red Don or White

Set in 1918, this section covers the initial opposition of the Don cossacks to the Bolsheviks, the effective surrender of many of them to Red forces, and then the growing discontent leading up to the Upper Don province revolting. In Tatarsk, the Melekhov family decide not to retreat with the White cossacks, but Mikhail Koshevoi and other communists begin purging the village of wealthier Cossacks. Piotra is protected by his old military comrade , now a Red leader, but Gregor is forced to flee to escape arrest.

2. The Cossacks Rise

The Don cossacks rise in response to the executions. Piotra Melekhov, leading the local squadrons, advances against the Reds but is outmaneuvered, captured and ultimately shot by Mikhail Koshevoi. The rebels effectively form their own soviet-style government, though they accept some logistical support from the Whites, who are fighting on the Donietz. Grigor becomes a division commander, holding Kargin against the Red forces, but is often appalled at his own side's actions, letting a number of family members of Red soldiers out of prison in Vieshenska. Mikhail Koshevoi becomes part of the Serdobsky regiment, and narrowly escapes when the men all defect to the rebels; his fellow communist Stockman is killed. Ivan Alexievich, a communist cossack from Tatarsk, is captured and driven through different villages with other prisoners being brutalised by crowds, before coming to Tatarsk and being shot by Piotra's widow Daria.

3. Retreat and Advance

In May 1919, the Red government pushes harder against the Don rebels, and they fall back to guard one side of the Don, leading all the fighting-age cossacks (Pantaleimon Melekhov included) to leave Tatarsk and guard a position on the other side of the river. Gregor works to keep order among the front, including forcing his own father not to desert, and his lover Aksinia moves to his camp opposite Vieshenska. Whilst the Melekhov men are on the other bank of the Don, Mikhail Koshevoi visits Tatarsk to remind Ilinicha, Gregor's mother, that he intends to marry her daughter Dunia; whilst there, he murders Grishaka, an elderly relative of Natalia's, and burns the houses of seven wealthier cossacks including the village priest. Eventually, the Reds retreat under pressure from advancing White forces.

4. The Shadows Fall

The Whites reach the insurgent army; Gregor's men link up with them as they push towards Ust-Miedvieditsa, but Gregor clashes with the White officer Fitzhelaurov, who treats him as a mere cossack with contempt despite their near-equivalent commands. He continues commanding his men for a while, but is eventually reduced in rank in favour of more upper class officers. Mitka Korshunov, a Tatarsk White cossack, returns with the Kalmyk regiments who are used for punitive actions, and kills the Koshevoi family in Mikhail's absence. The White general Sidorin comes to Tatarsk and provide medals and money to the women, in an attempt to drum up support for the war effort. Piotra's widow Daria is initially happy to have the money, as she has a disease, but she then discovers that it is syphilis and cannot be cured. She starts contemplating death, and admits to Natalia, Gregor's wife, that she assisted him in renewing his relationship with Aksinia. Natalia confronts Aksinia, who admits everything. Angry at Gregor, Natalia resolves not to have his third child, which she has just discovered herself to be pregnant with. The attempt to abort the pregnancy goes badly wrong, giving Natalia severe internal bleeding and causing her death. Gregor briefly returns to Tatarsk before returning to his new regiment; Daria drowns herself in the Don ten days after he leaves.

5. Flight to the Sea

Late in the summer of 1919, Pantaleimon is mobilised, but deserts rapidly. The Red overall strategy changes (this is attributed to Stalin), seeking to push through the Donbass area rather than the Don province, cutting the Whites' Volunteer Army off from their Cossack forces: by November this plan works, forcing the Volunteers to withdraw south, exposing the Cossacks' left flank and ultimately forcing them to retreat too. Gregor returns home with severe Typhus, from which he slowly recovers. The retreat reaches Tatarsk, and Pantaleimon and Gregor go by different routes. Gregor travels with his old orderly, Prokhor Zykov, and Aksinia, though he is forced to leave the latter behind when she becomes ill. On arriving at one village he finds that Pantaleimon has died, and buries him. Gregor falls ill himself, and Prokhor nurses him as they travel into the Kuban region, ultimately arriving in Novorossisk. There, the Whites are boarding ships and fleeing to the Crimea or to Turkey; Gregor and the other Cossacks are unable to get a place on a ship. Deciding not to attempt flight to Tbilisi, Gregor stays, and the section ends as the Reds close in on the port.

6. Home At Last

Aksinia returns home to Tatarsk, having recovered, and grows closer to the remaining Melekhovs out of their shared concern for Gregor. Mikhail Koshevoi returns too, and marries Dunia against her mother's wishes. Ilinicha for her part grows increasingly mad waiting for news of Gregor. It eventually transpires, when Prokhor Zykov (who has now lost an arm) returns, that he is now fighting for the Reds with Budionny's cavalry, and helping them win significant victories in the Ukraine. Gregor sends a letter which Ilinicha and Aksinia read numerous times to each other; Ilinicha dies before Gregor returns. Mikhail Koshevoi becomes the village's chairman, and is increasingly inflexible and defensive of the Red government's actions, as well as fearing for his life after he confronts and shoots at a cossack he suspects of White sympathies. Gregor finally returns having been demobilised - despite his military heroics, he cannot escape suspicion for his previous actions fighting for the insurgents and then the Whites, and found the Reds just as mistrustful of him as the Whites had been. Mikhail and Gregor are now implacable enemies, as the former suspects the latter of White sympathies. Gregor is forced to report to the Political Department in Vieshenska - where Piotra's old comrade Yakov Fomin warns him that former White officers are being rounded up. A few days later, as men from Vieshenska come to arrest him, Gregor flees with help from Dunia and Aksinia.

7. The Fugitive

Gregor wanders for a while, as in late 1920 supply shortages cause increasing tension in the region and armed bands spring up to oppose the grain requisitioning units. Eventually, Fomin himself attempts a revolt in Vieshenska, but the Communists maintain control of the machine-guns and his rising fails. Fleeing with his men, Fomin becomes a self-styled freedom fighter, though in practice he is little more than a bandit. Gregor joins him in preference to spending his life in hiding or prison, often clashing with him to prevent Fomin's men looting indiscriminately. Fomin's first band is wiped out, but after a long patch in hiding in the spring of 1921 he starts a second. Gregor eventually leaves Fomin and resolves to try and flee south with Aksinia, and hopefully start a new life there. As he and Aksinia try to flee southwards on horseback, though, they are shot at by some guards - Aksinia is hit in the base of the neck, killing her rapidly. After burying her, Gregor stays with some deserters camping in the woods for a while, before finally deciding to return to Tatarsk, symbolically throwing his rifle and pistol into the Don at last. On reaching there, he finds Dunia absent, Koshevoi gone to a military unit, and his daughter Poliushka a while since dead with pleurisy. The book ends with him holding his son Mikhail's hands in his own, outside the gate of the Melekhovs' old house, with the comment that these are the only things that life has left to him.

Footnotes

References

Mikhail Sholokhov